Fazle Rabbi Chowdhury (1 October 1934 – 20 December 2018) was a Bangladeshi politician from Gaibandha who was a member of parliament for six terms. As an advisor to President Hussain Mohammad Ershad, he represented the Jatiya Party for most of his lifetime.

Early life
Chowdhury was born on 1 October 1934, to a Bengali Muslim family of Chowdhuries from the village of Taluqzamira in Harinathpur, Palashbari under Gaibandha (formerly part of Rangpur District) in Bengal Province. He earned a M.Sc. and a PhD degree.

Career
Chowdhury was elected to Parliament from Gaibandha-3 in 1986, 1988, 1991, and 1996 as a candidate of Jatiya Party (Ershad). He was elected in 2001 as a candidate of Islami Jatiya Oikya Front and in 2008 as a candidate of Jatiya Party (Ershad). He was an advisor to President Hussain Mohammad Ershad. He worked as a professor at the Bangladesh Agricultural University. In 2015, he was the acting Chairperson of Jatiya Party. He later joined the Jatiya Party faction led by Kazi Zafar Ahmed. After Ahmed's death in 2015, Chowdhury became the chairman of the faction until his own death.

Death
Chowdhury died on 20 December 2018 in United Hospital, Dhaka.

References

1934 births
2018 deaths
People from Gaibandha District
Bangladesh Jatiya Party politicians
3rd Jatiya Sangsad members
4th Jatiya Sangsad members
5th Jatiya Sangsad members
7th Jatiya Sangsad members
8th Jatiya Sangsad members
9th Jatiya Sangsad members
Academic staff of Bangladesh Agricultural University
20th-century Bengalis
21st-century Bengalis
Bangladesh Nationalist Party politicians